Viacheslav Petrov (born August 13, 1994) is a Ukrainian professional basketball player for Prometey of the Latvian-Estonian Basketball League and EuroCup.

National team
In 2012, Petrov participated at the 2012 FIBA Europe Under-18 Championship. In 2016, Petrov made his debut for the Ukrainian national basketball team.

References 

1987 births
Living people
BC Khimik players
BC Kyiv players
BC Prometey players
Medalists at the 2019 Summer Universiade
People from Novomyrhorod
Power forwards (basketball)
Sportspeople from Kirovohrad Oblast
Ukrainian men's basketball players
Universiade silver medalists for Ukraine
Universiade medalists in basketball